Series 1 of Top Gear, a British motoring magazine and factual television programme, was broadcast in the United Kingdom on BBC Two during 2002, consisting of ten episodes that were aired between 20 October and 29 December. This series was the first to feature Jeremy Clarkson and Richard Hammond as the main hosts of the programme, a role they would both maintain until the twenty-second series, and the only series to feature Jason Dawe as their co-presenter before he was replaced in the second series (by James May). The series introduced much of the new elements that the programme had brought in as part of its relaunch of original 1977 programme of the same name, including the anonymous driver known as "The Stig" (portrayed by Perry McCarthy), and the celebrity timed laps that would begin with the Suzuki Liana.

Production
Following the cancellation of the original format of Top Gear in December 2001, previous format presenters Jeremy Clarkson and Andy Wilman convinced the BBC to revive the show with a new format for the following year. These new changes included the use of television studio segments and challenges, and a revamped presentation of reviews, unlike the previous show which focused on the production of cars. Clarkson later announced that he would present the new show, with Wilman serving as the executive producer, whilst motoring journalists Richard Hammond and Jason Dawe joined as new presenters, both of whom had not hosted the previous format.

Episodes

Best-of episodes

References

2002 British television seasons
Top Gear seasons